Marchaux-Chaudefontaine is a commune in the department of Doubs, eastern France. The municipality was established on 1 January 2018 by merger of the former communes of Marchaux (the seat) and Chaudefontaine.

See also 
Communes of the Doubs department

References 

Communes of Doubs